Lacrimosa is Kalafina's fourth single, featuring Wakana, Keiko and Hikaru. The single was released on March 4, 2009. The song was used as the closing theme to the anime television series Black Butler starting with episode 14. The single was also available as a limited edition release, containing a bonus DVD.

Track listings

CD

Limited edition DVD

Charts

References

2009 songs
2009 singles
Kalafina songs
Anime songs
SME Records singles
Songs written by Yuki Kajiura